Cheran Pandian is a 1991 Indian Tamil-language action drama film written and directed by K. S. Ravikumar, from a story by Erode Soundar. The film stars Vijayakumar, Sarathkumar, Anand Babu and Sreeja. It was released on 31 May 1991, emerged a box office success and won several Tamil Nadu State Film Awards. The film was remade in Telugu as Balarama Krishnulu (1992), and in Hindi in as Sautela (1999).

Plot 
Manicheran Gounder or Periya Gounder, the rich head of the Muthupalayam village in Coimbatore District, living with his wife Paarvathi and daughter Vennila, is a person who strictly adheres to the caste system. Rajapaandi or Chinna Gounder is Periya Gounder's half brother and also a rich landlord in the same village, and Parimalam is his sister. Since Rajapaandi's mother was from a suppressed caste, Periya Gounder stays aloof from him and always ignores and berates Rajapaandi and Parimalam. Manicheran had split his share of ancestral properties and went separate at age 18, when his father Bunglow Gounder married Rajapaandi's mother. Still Bunglow Gounder, before dying, had divided his entire self-earned property, including the house, equally between the two brothers, and they live on either side of the bungalow house, split by a wall in the middle. Yet, Periya Gounder's family gets first respect within the village and the local temple, and he refuses to yield any privilege to Rajapaandi.

Chandran, a first cousin of Rajapaandi through his maternal uncle, comes to meet and work under him in the village since his parents are dead, and he could not manage to find a job in Tirupur. He also falls in love with Vennila. Periya Gounder is furious when he learns of this and tries to get Vennila married to his brother-in-law, and after being rebuked by him, he makes arrangements for Vennila's marriage with a womanising thug, son of a devious village elder, since he belongs to his own caste. After a serious turn of events, Periya Gounder has a change of heart with some heartfelt advice from Paarvathi, renounces his casteist mindset and accepts Rajapaandi as his equal sibling and Chandran and Vennila end up getting married.

Cast

Production 
Cheran Pandian is K. S. Ravikumar's second film as director. Producer R. B. Choudary had previously stated he would finance Ravikumar's second directorial film, regardless of how well his first (Puriyaadha Pudhir) performed at the box office.

Soundtrack 
The music composed by Soundaryan, who also wrote the lyrics. The song "Kadhal Kaditham" is set in Mohanam raga.

Release and reception 
Cheran Pandian was released on 31 May 1991. C. R. K. of Kalki appreciated the songs, but criticised their abundance. He also criticised Ravikumar's direction and writing. Cheran Pandian won the Tamil Nadu State Film Awards for Special Prize for Best Film, Best Story Writer (Erode Soundar) and Best Sound Recording (Sampath). Vijayakumar won the Cinema Express Award for Best Character Actor.

Legacy 
After the film's success, Ravikumar regularly collaborated with Sarathkumar, in films like Nattamai (1994), Natpukkaga (1998), Paattali (1999) and Samudhiram (2001) after which he became a highly sought-after filmmaker in the Tamil film industry. Cheran Pandian was remade in Telugu as Balarama Krishnulu (1992), and in Hindi in as Sautela (1999).

References

External links 
 

1990s action drama films
1990s Tamil-language films
1991 films
Films directed by K. S. Ravikumar
Indian action drama films
Super Good Films films
Tamil films remade in other languages